TK-3 may refer to:

TK-3 (tankette), a Polish military vehicle of the Second World War
Teradako-ken TK-3, a Japanese transport plane of the Second World War
TK-3 (missile) or Sky Bow III, a 2010s Taiwanese anti-aircraft system

See also
VR Class Tk3, a Finnish class of freight locomotive